Allen Cohen may refer to:
 Allen Cohen (composer), American composer, conductor and university professor
 Allen Cohen (poet) (1940–2004), American poet

See also
Alan N. Cohen (1930–2004), American businessman, owner of basketball teams
Alan Cohen (born 1954), American businessman, owner of ice hockey team